Thomas Andrew Low,  (March 12, 1871 – February 9, 1931) was a Canadian industrialist and politician.

Born in Quebec City, Quebec, the son of Alexander George Low and Margaret Henderson, he was educated in Pembroke, Ontario and became a manufacturer in Renfrew. Low was president of Renfrew Flour Mills, Renfrew Electric Products, the Renfrew Refrigerator Company, the Renfrew Manufacturing Company and the British Canadian Export Company. In 1904, he married Mary G. Dean. He was first elected to the House of Commons of Canada in the Ontario riding of Renfrew South in the 1908 federal election. A Liberal, he was re-elected in 1911 but resigned shortly afterward. He ran again in the 1921 election and was re-elected. He was defeated in the 1925 election and again in the 1930 election. From 1921 to 1923, he was a Minister without Portfolio. From 1923 to 1925, he was the Minister of Trade and Commerce.

References 

1871 births
1931 deaths
Liberal Party of Canada MPs
Members of the House of Commons of Canada from Ontario
Members of the King's Privy Council for Canada
Politicians from Quebec City